The Ministry of Finance of the Republic of Croatia is the ministry in the Government of Croatia which is in charge of state finances and the budget.

List ministers

References

External links
Official website 

Finance
Croatia
Croatia, Finance